I Dream is a fully through-composed opera by Douglas Tappin (librettist, lyricist, composer), based on the life of Martin Luther King Jr.

The world premiere of this Rhythm and Blues Opera opened in July 2010 on the Alliance Stage of the Woodruff Arts Center in Atlanta, Georgia.

Original cast and creative team
Jasmine Guy – Director
Carl Marsh – Orchestration
Keith Williams – Musical director
With choreography by Dawn Axam, and designs by Kat Conley (set), Joseph Futral (lighting), Shilla Benning (costumes), and Bobby Johnston (sound).
The producers were Dej Mahoney, Cedric Perrier, Tim Bowen, and Douglas Tappin.

The cast included:
Quentin Earl Darrington as "Martin"
Demetria McKinney as "Coretta"
Avery Sunshine as "Grandma"
Desmond Ellington as "Hosea2
Ben Polite as "Ralph"
and Bob Carlisle

Reception
I Dream opened to mostly positive reviews from both the press and those involved with the civil rights movement. RollingOut.com said: "The life of Dr. King as chronicled in the stage musical I Dream, is right on time as a reminder of what the fight was for. The dynamically talented cast delivered stirring performances to move audience members through each riveting scene." Creative Loafing reported that "Tappin's hugely ambitious world premiere follows the example of Broadway's big, rock-influenced musicals such as Jesus Christ Superstar, Evita, and Les Miserables." The Huffington Post stated: "[The show brought] some of the heartiest former Civil Rights activists in the house to tears, before raising them to their feet at the finale for, perhaps, the greatest standing ovation the show will ever receive."

Nominated in 10 categories for Atlanta's 2009/2010 Suzi Bass Award, I Dream won in the "Outstanding World Premiere" (Play or Musical) category.

Recording
A concept album of I Dream entitled I Dream (The Concept Recording) was recorded in 2015, featuring Quentin Darrington as "Martin" and Avery Sunshine as "Coretta" - released for digital download and streaming, including on iTunes, Google Play, and Spotify.

Additional productions
 John F. Kennedy Center for the Performing Arts, January 2017 (concert)
 Toledo Opera, April 2018

See also
 Civil rights movement in popular culture

References

External links

Playbill, January 15, 2018, Fountain Street Church, Grand Rapids, Michigan

2010 operas
Cultural depictions of Martin Luther King Jr.
Operas set in the 20th century
Operas set in the United States
Operas
Operas based on real people